Down Under Donovan is a 1918 crime novel by the British writer Edgar Wallace.

Film adaptation
In 1922 it was made into a British silent film called Down Under Donovan made by Stoll Pictures and starring Cora Goffin.

References

Bibliography
 Goble, Alan. The Complete Index to Literary Sources in Film. Walter de Gruyter, 1999.

1918 British novels
Novels by Edgar Wallace
British crime novels
British novels adapted into films